3600 series may refer to:

 Keisei 3600 series Japanese electric multiple unit operating for Keisei Electric Railway
 UTE3600 series Spanish electric multiple unit formerly operating for Ferrocarrils de la Generalitat Valenciana